Mera Naam Shaji is a 2019 Indian Malayalam-language comedy film directed by Nadirshah and produced by B. Rakesh under the banner of Universal cinemas. The film features Biju Menon, Asif Ali, and Baiju Santhosh in titular roles. The film was written by Dileep Ponnan, while music was composed by Emil Muhammed. Nikhila Vimal is the female lead and Sreenivasan also plays an important role.

Plot
The story revolves around the lives of three 'Shajis' from different places in Kerala, Shaji Sukumaran from Thiruvananthapuram, Shaji George from Kochi, and Shaji Usman from Kozhikode. Shaji Usman is a quotation goon who accepts risky operations for the sake of supporting his family. His strange modus operandi is to stab people in the rear. Once, he gets a quotation through Adv. Lawrence, to attack Dominic, a popular party leader at Cochin.

Shaji George is a con man in Cochin, who happens to be the brother of Dominic. Simultaneously, Shaji Sukumaran who is a cab driver is on the way to Cochin with four young people. He notices that one of them, Neenu is seen spending the entire journey alone behind the car, with a doomed face. It doesn't take long for driver Shaji to understand that she is in trouble. The goon Shaji arrives at Cochin, stabs Dominic and leaves before driver Shaji passes by and spots the injured Dominic. He immediately takes him to the hospital. Later, goon Shaji calls his informer and then removes his sim card and throws it off a bridge to destroy any possible evidence. It happens that the youngster Shaji and his sidekick Kuntheesan are drinking beneath the bridge, and the sim card falls right into Kuntheesan's glass. He puts it into his phone before youngster Shaji gets a call about his brother's incident. They rush to the hospital but Dominic who hates his brother due to his lazy attitude, asks him to stay away. Meanwhile, Kuntheesan gets a call from someone through the new sim card. When the caller asks for Shaji (the goon), the phone is handed over to the youngster Shaji on the account of their same name. The caller says that a reward of 5 lakhs would be given the next day and youngster Shaji who is drunk, says okay.

The next day, as he is back to his senses, goes in search of the reward before finding out that the person who announced it is the one behind his brother's attack. As they trace the person, it happens to be the right-hand man to Dominic, Sakav GK. After leaving the reward in a dustbin as per youngster Shaji's directions, GK drives away while he gets a call from goon Shaji. Only then does he understand the whole mix up. As the two go to the hospital, goon Shaji calls in the number and Kuntheesan attends it. As goon Shaji says he wants to hand over a quotation, Kuntheesan who thinks he too can get money as earlier, decides to repeat the incident. But he gets caught by goon Shaji. Kuntheesan is tied up by goon Shaji who wants his money back.

Meanwhile, the driver Shaji is approached by Neenu who gives him a phone number. This number belongs to youngster Shaji and it is revealed that the two of them were in love with each other. A flashback shows how love blossoms between Neenu and her neighbour youngster Shaji. Neenu's father, who is clearly not interested in this relation, approaches Dominic who assures him to keep his brother away from her at any cost. Dominic hatches a cruel plan to send youngster Shaji to Nagercoil so that Neenu's father can marry her off to a suitable alliance. This saddens youngster Shaji.

Neenu calls her long lost boyfriend to tell him how bad her life has been after the marriage. The guy, Jerome is a ruthless brat with friend circles with numerous unhealthy relationships. Youngster Shaji is angered at Jerome and his friends and beats them up. But he is also beaten, and when driver Shaji comes to stop them, he gets hit too. Driver Shaji feels sorry for youngster Shaji, and agrees to help him save Neenu. Meanwhile, goon Shaji calls the traitor and the phone is attended by driver Shaji, leading to hilarious conversations.

Jerome and his team leave for the seaport in a different cab the next day. The driver and youngster Shajis leave for the seaport but gets stuck in the traffic jam. Meanwhile, goon Shaji who is instructed by Lawrence to pack his things for leaving, also enters the same road. Jerome's vehicle also enters, in which a girl starts an argument which disturbs the driver and ultimately causes the vehicle to crash onto a set of shops and create panic. Goon Shaji who sees this, drives his car at full speed towards the crashed vehicle before stopping it, and heroically gets out. It follows with a fight wherein goon Shaji beats Jerome and his friend black and blue, while Neenu escapes. Youngster Shaji arrives at the seaport and is saddened to see the cruise leaving. Later, all the three Shajis arrive at Lawrence's hotel room. Neenu and youngster Shaji reunite, and Lawrence ensures to take care of all legal issues. Goon Shaji's money is given to him. Neenu and youngster Shaji ride away happily and driver Shaji, after one more hilarious phone conversation with an unknown goon Shaji, happily drives back home.

Before leaving home, goon Shaji pulls away his sim card and throws it down a bridge yet again. The sim card is found by two men who are drinking beneath the bridge. One of them inserts it in a mobile phone, and gets a call from someone asking for "Shaji". Upon hearing this, the other guy who is also named Shaji, is astonished and answers the call, while the credits start appearing.

Cast

Biju Menon as Shaji Usman
Asif Ali as Shaji George
Baiju Santhosh as Shaji Sukumaran
Nikhila Vimal as Neenu Thomas
Sreenivasan as Advocate Lawrence
K. B. Ganesh Kumar as Dominic George
Tini Tom as Ummachan
Dharmajan Bolgatty as Kuntheeshan
Mythili as Laila Shaji, Shaji Usman's Wife
 Jomon K John as Jerome, Neenu's husband
 Shafiqu Rahman as Aby, Diana's husband
 Asha Aravind as Dominic's Wife
Surabhi Lakshmi as Shaji Sukumaran's wife
G. Suresh Kumar as Thomas Parangadi Moran
Sadiq as Saghavu Gopakumar
Nirmal Palazhi as Shaji Usman's Friend
Kalabhavan Navas as Marunnu Johny
 Savithri Sreedharan as an old lady (Cameo Appearance)
 Ranjini Haridas as Diana (Extended Cameo)
 Bheeman Raghu as A Gang leader (Cameo Appearance)
 Hareesh Kanaran as Shaji's friend (Cameo Appearance)
Jaffar Idukki As Politician
 Soubin Shahir as Shaji (Cameo Appearance)
 Thajudeen Vatakara as The Qawwali Singer (Cameo Appearance)

 Remya Thomas as Cameo Appearance

Music

The film score is composed by Jakes Bejoy while the three songs featured in the film are composed by Emil Muhammed with lyrics are written by Santhosh Varma and Munna Shoukath.

Release
The first look poster of Mera Naam Shaji was released on 13 February 2019. The film was released on 5 April 2019.

Reception
This film received mixed reviews and was an average run at the box office.

References

External links

2010s Malayalam-language films
Indian comedy films
Films shot in Thiruvananthapuram
Films shot in Kochi
Films shot in Kozhikode
Films directed by Nadirshah